John Craik Lyall Sydney Wall (25 October 1891 - 9 June 1969) was an Australian cricketer and rugby league footballer who represented New South Wales in both sports.

Lyal wall Played for Balmain for 8 years 

Throughout 1 year he was with Annandale then Moved to Balmain for 8 years.

Career
Wall made his first grade rugby league debut with Balmain Tigers in 1912, had a brief season at Annandale in 1913 before returning to the Tigers until the end of season 1919. Lyall played fullback and centre throughout his league career, and was also a prolific goal kicker. By 1920, he left the Balmain district and turned out for the Western Suburbs Magpies for one season.

A long-standing friendship with Herb Gilbert brought him to the St. George Dragons for the club's debut season in 1921, and played centre, wing and fullback for the Dragon's in their debut year. As established players, Lyall Wall, George Carstairs, Herb Gilbert and Reg Fusedale all brought much needed experience to the St. George Dragons club in its foundation year.

Wall represented the New South Wales rugby league team on four occasions during 1919.

As a cricketer, Wall played 11 first-class matches for New South Wales between 1914/15 and 1924/25.

References

External links
 

1891 births
1969 deaths
St. George Dragons players
Annandale rugby league players
Western Suburbs Magpies players
Balmain Tigers players
New South Wales rugby league team players
Australian rugby league players
Rugby league fullbacks
Rugby league centres
Rugby league wingers
Rugby league players from Sydney
Australian cricketers
New South Wales cricketers
Cricketers from Sydney